Ajalpan is a city in the southeastern part of the state of Puebla in Mexico. It has come to fame recently for lynching two pollsters in October, 2015, when townspeople mistook them for kidnappers and burned them alive. At a Latitude of 18.370003 and a Longitude of -97.2499466, Ajalpan lies near the northern border of the adjacent state of Oaxaca, and is the municipal seat of the Ajalpan Municipality, which surrounds it. 

This small city lies in the desert valley south east of the city of Tehuacan between Altepexi and Coxcatlan. One of the products commonly associated with Ajalpan are the red clay roofing shingles or tiles known as 'tejas'. For this reason many of the inhabitants jokingly refer to it as "Ajalpan da las tejas" (meaning: Ajalpan makes shingles) but when spoken sounds like "Ajalpan Day Laws Tayhaws" or "Ajalpan Dallas, Texas".

The region around Ajalpan is fairly arid and there are many types of cactus growing round about. The prickly pear (or 'tuna'/'pitajaya' (in Nahuatl: nōchtli )) grows naturally in the area and is harvested by the inhabitants who eat the fruit or use the sweet juice in drinks.

References
Link to tables of population data from Census of 2005 INEGI: Instituto Nacional de Estadística, Geografía e Informática
Puebla Enciclopedia de los Municipios de México
"As Frustrations with Mexico's Government Rise, So Do Lynchings" New York Times, January 23, 2016

Populated places in Puebla